The 2012 European Cup, known as the Alitalia European Cup for sponsorship purposes, is a rugby league football tournament.

Four teams competed in the 2012 event, with teams to be decided in November 2011 following the Four Nations. These were announced as Ireland, Scotland, Italy and the England Knights.

In mid-2012, Italy had to withdraw from the competition due to travel commitments and were omitted from the league to leave 3 teams:- England Knights, Ireland and Scotland.

As they won both of their games the England Knights won the Alitalia European Cup and thus became European Champions. This was the England Knights first European Championship. However England have won 14 times.

Teams

Scotland vs Ireland

Ireland vs England Knights

England Knights vs Scotland

References

European Cup
European Nations Cup
European Cup, 2012
European Cup, 2012
International rugby league competitions hosted by the United Kingdom
International rugby league competitions hosted by Ireland
2012 in English rugby league